New Quay Lifeboat Station is an RNLI lifeboat station in the coastal resort of New Quay, Ceredigion, West Wales. It was established in 1864 and in 2014 celebrated 150 years of service. In 2014 the station operated two lifeboats: a Mersey class all-weather boat and a D class inshore boat.

History

19th century
The first lifeboat station was built on New Quay town beach in 1864 at a cost of £130 in response to a number of wrecks in the preceding years, including six in one night in the Royal Charter Storm of October 1859, following which the Inspecting Commander of the Coastguard for the area had petitioned the RNLI for a lifeboat. The first lifeboat, Forester, originally funded by the Ancient Order of Foresters, had served at Holyhead for six years and, before being sent to New Quay, she was sent to London by rail to be lengthened to accommodate 12 oars. She served at New Quay as Forester until 1872 and was then renamed Nelson, under which name she served until 1884. E. M. Lewis was Coxswain in 1880 when a lifeboatman was put aboard the barque Pacific to pilot her out of danger during a gale; the lifeboatmen successfully claimed salvage of £325 but then refused to pay the customary charge for the use of the lifeboat, resulting in Lewis's dismissal. He was succeeded by Owen Evans.

New Quay's new lifeboat was Frank and Marion, built by Forrest & Son of Limehouse, London, costing £374, a gift from Dr and Mrs Smart of Kent in 1886. The day of the naming ceremony was declared a public holiday. Frank and Marion was built along the same lines as Nelson but with improved ballast tanks and rowing conformation to provide greater power for less effort. She effected several rescues before Coxswain Evans retired in 1905 after serving for 25 years. He was succeeded by David Davies. The lifeboat was launched a recorded seven times during her service, saving 19 lives.

20th century
A new boathouse and slipway were built to the south of the original in 1903–4 at a cost of £1,312; the original boathouse was passed on to the Harbour Commission. The 1904 boathouse, when superseded in 1992, was renamed Cnwc-y-Glap and was still in use in 2014.

From 1907 the station used the pulling and sailing lifeboat, William Cantrell Ashley, the longest-serving lifeboat at the station. The lifeboat was funded by the legacy of Charles Carr Ashley, which provided for five lifeboats and included funds for maintenance and for the benefit of crew members' widows and their families in the event of loss of life. The lifeboat was transported from London by rail to Fishguard and sailed to New Quay by the same 15 crew that had delivered Frank and Marion to Fishguard at the end of her service.

In August 1917, after going out to two boys fishing in a small boat in deteriorating weather, the lifeboat diverted to rescue two fishermen whose boat was foundering; all four were saved. For 17 years in the 1920s and 1930s the coxswain was Frederick Shayler. In a gale and heavy seas the tow had parted and the lifeboat, dwarfed by the 3,000 ton cruiser, took off seven of the eight crew, with the captain refusing to leave (he was rescued two days later by Aberystwyth lifeboat).

In February 1946 William Cantrell Ashley was at sea for more than 24 hours in severe weather standing by the broken-down submarine  and helping to rescue her crew. William Cantrell Ashley was the RNLI's last pulling and sailing lifeboat when she was retired in 1948 after 41 years' service. She was passed on to the first Outward Bound school at Aberdovey. In the same year the RNLI adapted the station for a new lifeboat and built a tractor house.

The first powered lifeboat at New Quay was the  St Albans which served from 1948 to 1970.

An inshore lifeboat and boathouse was added in 1967. In 1970 an Oakley-class lifeboat, Bird's Eye, was donated to the station by Bird's Eye Foods Ltd. In 1992 another new boathouse was constructed to house both lifeboats. On her retirement, Bird's Eye went on display at the Seawatch Centre, Moelfre, and New Quay took delivery of a Mersey-class all-weather lifeboat.

In 1994 Winston Evans retired as coxswain after 29 years; he had been Britain's youngest coxswain aged 26 in 1965, taking over the helm from Rhoslan Davies. Winston's father, Arden Evans, had also been coxswain and between them they served for 40 years. In 1966 Winston received the RNLI Bronze Medal for a rescue in Cardigan Bay and was awarded the British Empire Medal (BEM) in 1985. His successor was Daniel Potter, a great nephew of Frederick Shayler. Winston Evans recalled that in his time most crew members were fishermen, but in later years came from many different walks of life.

21st century
Audrey Lawson-Johnston, a survivor of the  sinking in 1915, gifted a new D-class lifeboat in 2004, named Amy Lea after her mother. Mrs Lawson-Johnston died in 2011 and when a new D-class came on station in 2012 it was named Audrey LJ in her memory.

Current operations
New Quay Lifeboat Station operates two lifeboats from the same building: the Mersey class all-weather boat Frank and Lena Clifford of Stourbridge (ON1172/12-15) and the D class inshore boat Audrey LJ (D 754).

The station celebrated 150 years of service in 2014 and local MP Mark Williams posted an Early Day Motion in the House of Commons in June to mark the occasion. In the same month the two lifeboats were re-dedicated in a ceremony which included a fly-past and a slate plaque being presented to the station by local fundraisers Quay West Ladies.

Since 2011 an annual raft race has been held in aid of the lifeboat station; in 2014 the event raised £2,165.

Fleet

All Weather Lifeboats (ALBs)

Inshore Lifeboats (ILBs)

Awards
At least one crew member has been awarded the BEM. Winston Evans was awarded his in 1985. The station and its lifeboat crews over its 150 years plus of operations have gained the following RNLI awards:

Four Bronze Medals have been awarded. The recipients were - 
 1966 Coxswain Winston Evans, Motor Mechanic Sydney Fowler and Crewman David Rees
 1974 Mervyn Lloyd Thomas

Thanks of the Institution on Vellum has been awarded to -
1967 Idris Evans, Trevor Evans and Peter Evans
1974 Richard Llewellyn Davies and David Richard Phillips 
1976 Mervyn Lloyd Thomas

An Exceptional First Aid Certificate was awarded to crew member Gary Hartley in 2011.

Visitor access
This station is classed as an "Explore" lifeboat station by the RNLI, their highest level of visitor experience.

See also
 Royal National Lifeboat Institution
 List of RNLI stations
 Royal National Lifeboat Institution lifeboats

References

Bibliography

External links

 New Quay Lifeboat Station on RNLI website

Lifeboat stations in Wales
1864 establishments in Wales
Transport infrastructure completed in 1864
New Quay